The 1967 LPGA Tour was the 18th season since the LPGA Tour officially began in 1950. The season ran from March 16 to November 19. The season consisted of 28 official money events. Kathy Whitworth won the most tournaments, eight. She also led the money list with earnings of $32,937.

There were two first-time winners in 1967: Catherine Lacoste from France and Margie Masters from Australia. They were the first winners from the continents of Europe and Australia, respectively. This season also saw the last playing of the Women's Western Open, an LPGA major.

The tournament results and award winners are listed below.

Tournament results
The following table shows all the official money events for the 1967 season. "Date" is the ending date of the tournament. The numbers in parentheses after the winners' names are the number of wins they had on the tour up to and including that event. Majors are shown in bold.

am - amateur
* - non-member at time of win

Awards

References

External links
LPGA Tour official site
1967 season coverage at golfobserver.com

LPGA Tour seasons
LPGA Tour